Michelle Weis (born 10 April 1997) is a Danish ice hockey player and member of the Danish national ice hockey team, currently playing with Djurgårdens IF Hockey of the Swedish Women's Hockey League (SDHL) on loan from the Malmö Redhawks Dam of the Swedish Damettan.

Playing career 
In the 2015–16 season, she was loaned by Hvidovre IK to Luleå HF/MSSK of the Riksserien (renamed SDHL in 2016) in preparation for the playoffs, ultimately winning the 2016 Swedish Championship with the team. She then signed with Luleå for the 2016–17 season.

At 19, she joined the Maine Black Bears women's ice hockey program in the Hockey East (WHEA) conference of the NCAA Division I. As a rookie in the 2017–18 season, Weis registered 21 points (9+12) in 35 games and earned Hockey East's Pro-Ambitions Rookie of the Week honors for the week of 2 October.

International play
Weis has represented Denmark at seven IIHF Women's World Championships: at the Top Division tournament in 2021, Denmark’s first Top Division tournament since 1992, and at the Division I Group A tournaments in 2013, 2014, 2015, 2016, 2018, and 2019. She was Denmark's second leading scorer in the Olympic qualification for the women's ice hockey tournament at the 2022 Winter Olympics, at which Denmark qualified to participate in the Olympic Games for the first time in team history.

As a junior player with the Danish national under-18 team, Weis participated in the Division I Qualification tournament of the IIHF Women's U18 World Championships in 2015. She tied with Kamila Wieczorek of Poland as top scorer of the tournament, ranking first in goals (8), assists (5), and points (13), and was selected by the coaches as Denmark's best player of the tournament.

References

External links 
 
Michelle Weis: Career Statistics at US College Hockey Online (USCHO)

Living people
1997 births
People from Gentofte Municipality
Danish women's ice hockey forwards
Danish ice hockey centres
Djurgårdens IF Hockey Dam players
Maine Black Bears women's ice hockey players
Luleå HF/MSSK players
Danish expatriate ice hockey people
Danish expatriate sportspeople in Sweden
Expatriate ice hockey players in Sweden
Danish expatriate sportspeople in the United States
Expatriate ice hockey players in the United States
Ice hockey players at the 2022 Winter Olympics
Olympic ice hockey players of Denmark
Sportspeople from the Capital Region of Denmark